Umabel was the debut EP release by Australian indie rock band Love Outside Andromeda, on Shock Records in 2003. It was recorded at Bootfull Audio by Matthew Dufty, and the cover art is by Matthew Chapman.

Track listing
Tracks 1, 2 and 4 were written by Sianna Lee; track 3 was written by Jamie Slocombe. Arrangements were by Love Outside Andromeda.

 "Umabel" – 5:10
 "Back of My Head" – 3:33
 "New Dawn" – 3:49
 "Raido" (Acoustic) – 2:59

Instruments 
 Sianna Lee - Vocals and guitar
 Jamie Slocombe - Vocals and guitar
 Jesse Lee - Bass
 Joe Hammond - Drums
 Tihm Harvey - Guitar

External links
Love Outside Andromeda | Releases

2001 debut EPs
Love Outside Andromeda albums